Massimo Donati (born 26 March 1981) is an Italian football coach, pundit and former professional player, who played as a central or defensive midfielder. He is the manager of Legnago Salus in Serie D.

Born in San Vito al Tagliamento, Italy, Donati began his career at Atalanta, before joining Milan in June 2001. After spending time on loan at Parma, Torino, Sampdoria, Messina and Atalanta, he signed for Scottish club Celtic in June 2007. While at Celtic, he won one Scottish Premier League medal and one Scottish League Cup medal. He returned to Italy in August 2009, to join Bari, where he remained until January 2012, when he signed for Palermo. He joined Hellas Verona in June 2013, before going back to Bari in August 2014. He returned to Scotland in July 2016, to sign for Hamilton Academical and then moved to St Mirren in February 2018.

Donati represented Italy at under-16, under-18, under-20 and under-21 levels.

Playing career

Atalanta and Milan
Donati started his club career at Atalanta, before moving to Milan in June 2001 along with Cristian Zenoni for 60 billion lire in a cash-plus-player deal. However, due to the competition at the club, Donati was unable to retain a first team place after his first season, spending the 2002–03 season on loan at Parma and then Torino.

The 2003–04 season, his third as a Milan player, saw him join Sampdoria on loan, before enjoying a successful spell at Messina for the 2004–05 and 2005–06 seasons. Despite finding his form at Messina, Donati still found himself out of favour at Milan and was again sent on loan, this time returning to his first club Atalanta for the 2006–07 season.

Donati was a youth international, representing Italy at under-16, under-18, under-20 and under-21 levels.

Celtic
On 29 June 2007, Celtic confirmed the signing of Donati on a four-year contract for a fee of €2 million. Donati was given the number 18 jersey, vacated by ex-captain Neil Lennon and was unveiled at Celtic Park. He made his Celtic debut in their first league game of the season on 5 August, a 0–0 draw with Kilmarnock. In Celtic's next league game against Falkirk, Donati was involved in his side's equaliser when his shot hit Kenny Milne and went into the net; Celtic won the game 4–1. The following week, Donati grabbed his first competitive Celtic goal with an equalising goal against Aberdeen and later added an assist for Kenny Miller as Celtic won 3–1.

On 28 November, Donati won the match for Celtic in the UEFA Champions League fixture against Shakhtar Donetsk, netting in the 92nd minute to win the match 2–1. This result meant Celtic only needed a point away to Donati's former club Milan at the San Siro to qualify for the last 16 stage of the tournament. Celtic lost 1–0 to Milan, but still qualified for the last 16 as runners-up in their group after Benfica defeated Shakhtar in Ukraine. As the season went on, Donati's form began to dip, resulting in the central midfield positions being changed with Barry Robson and Paul Hartley in place of Donati and Scott Brown. In May 2008, it was reported that Donati wanted to go back to Serie A.

In the 2008–09 season, Donati made only a handful of appearances for Celtic, though he started in the home game against Kilmarnock on 12 November 2008 and won the man of the match award.

After the appointment of Tony Mowbray as Celtic manager, Donati won back his place in the Celtic midfield alongside new signing Landry N'Guémo. Donati played in most of the pre-season games and scored in a 5–0 win over African Champions League winners Al-Ahly in the Wembley Cup. He started the 2009–10 campaign in fine form and scored from a spectacular volley in Celtic's 3–1 loss to Arsenal in the Champions League play-off.

Bari
On 27 August 2009, Donati left Celtic and signed a four-year contract with Serie A newcomers Bari.

Palermo
On 18 January 2012, Donati left Bari for Palermo in Serie A.

Hellas Verona
In June 2013, Donati was signed by Hellas Verona.

Bari
On 26 August 2014, Donati returned to Bari. He scored his first goal in the 2014–15 Serie B season on 13 September 2014, during a 1–1 draw with Frosinone.

Hamilton Academical
On 18 July 2016, Donati returned to Scotland to sign for Hamilton Academical. He scored on his debut as Hamilton won 3–0 against St Mirren in the Scottish League Cup. On 9 November 2016, Donati signed a new contract, keeping him at the club until 2019.

In January 2018, Hamilton announced that they had agreed with Donati to cancel his existing playing contract, in order for him to begin a coaching career. Donati had also been coaching the Hamilton under-15 team.

St Mirren
Donati signed a short-term contract with St Mirren in February 2018. He was released by St Mirren at the end of this contract.

Media career
In 2018, Donati was unveiled as a new color commentator and pundit for DAZN, a role he left in June 2021 following his appointment as Sambenedettese's new head coach.

He briefly resumed his role at DAZN between August and September 2021, leaving again after Sambenedettese was successfully readmitted into Serie D.

Coaching career
In June 2019, Donati joined the coaching staff at Kilmarnock under Angelo Alessio.

On 25 June 2021, he was appointed as the new head coach of Sambenedettese. The club, originally scheduled to play Serie C in the 2021–22 season, was successively demoted to Serie D due to financial irregularities; nevertheless, in September 2021 Donati was confirmed he would stay at Sambenedettese also in the lower tier. On 31 October 2021, Donati was dismissed from his role following a negative start in the club's Serie D campaign.

On 16 June 2022, Donati was appointed as the new manager of Legnago Salus, who had just been relegated to Serie D.

Career statistics

Honours

Club
Celtic

Scottish Premier League: 2007–08
Scottish League Cup: 2008–09

References

External links
 
 
 

1981 births
Living people
People from San Vito al Tagliamento
Italian footballers
Italy under-21 international footballers
Italy youth international footballers
Atalanta B.C. players
A.C. Milan players
A.C.R. Messina players
Parma Calcio 1913 players
Torino F.C. players
U.C. Sampdoria players
Celtic F.C. players
S.S.C. Bari players
Palermo F.C. players
Hellas Verona F.C. players
Hamilton Academical F.C. players
Serie A players
Serie B players
Scottish Premier League players
Scottish Professional Football League players
Association football midfielders
Italian expatriate footballers
Expatriate footballers in Scotland
Italian expatriate sportspeople in Scotland
Hamilton Academical F.C. non-playing staff
St Mirren F.C. players
Kilmarnock F.C. non-playing staff
Footballers from Friuli Venezia Giulia